The Battle of the Boulevard, also referred to as the Belmont–Lipscomb basketball rivalry is a college basketball rivalry between the Belmont University Bruins and the Lipscomb University Bisons. Its nickname was established because of both school's close placement in Nashville, Tennessee– about three miles apart on the same road. The rivalry was classified as non-conference following Belmont's departure from the Atlantic Sun Conference prior to the 2012–13 NCAA Division I basketball season. Their first meeting took place on December 11, 1953. It is one of the geographically closest rivalries in NCAA Division I.

Series history 
Officially the first meeting took place on December 11, 1953, with Belmont emerging victorious 72–53. Neither team was in the NCAA.

Perhaps the greatest college basketball game between Belmont University and Lipscomb University was played on February 17, 1990 in front of an NAIA-record sellout crowd of 15,399 at Memorial Gymnasium (Vanderbilt University) in Nashville, Tennessee. Lipscomb won 124–105. Current Lipscomb athletics director and former star Philip Hutcheson said, "If you looked at Belmont’s box score alone you could have never imagined that they lost the game with the points they scored and the stat lines they had." 

On January 27, 2004, both teams met in NCAA Division I conference play for the first time, with Belmont prevailing 66–64 in overtime.  

On March 4, 2006, the two met in the finals of the Atlantic Sun tournament, with the winner earning the conference's automatic bid to the NCAA tournament. Although both schools compiled a rich NAIA post-season history, neither had ever made an NCAA tournament appearance. Lipscomb guard James Poindexter drained a three-pointer with 27.7 seconds remaining in regulation to stake Lipscomb to a 58–55 lead, but Belmont guard Justin Hare responded with a driving layup, and was fouled with 20.7 seconds remaining. After making the tying free-throw, the game went into overtime, where Belmont won 74–69. 

Despite playing in different conferences since the start of the 2012–13 season, the two schools agreed to continue playing each other, and typically square off at least twice each season.

References 

Belmont Bruins men's basketball
Lipscomb Bisons men's basketball
Basketball in Nashville, Tennessee
College basketball rivalries in the United States